The Smines Bridge is a cantilever bridge in the southern part of the municipality of Namsos in Trøndelag county, Norway. Together with the Hestøy Bridge, they form a link over the Fjærangen fjord connecting the village of Lund to the rest of the municipality.

See also
List of bridges in Norway
List of bridges in Norway by length
List of bridges
List of bridges by length

References

Road bridges in Trøndelag
Namsos